Stylidium exappendiculatum is a species of dicotyledonous plant in the genus Stylidium (family Stylidiaceae).

It was first described in 1991 by Allen Lowrie and Sherwin Carlquist as a subspecies of Stylidium emarginatum, and was raised to species level by Juliet Wege in 2012. According to the Catalogue of Life, Stylidium exappendiculatum does not have any known subspecies.

References 

exappendiculatum